The General Confederation of Mauritanian Workers (CGTM) is a national trade union center in Mauritania that was founded in 1993. It  has a membership of 25,000 and is affiliated with the International Trade Union Confederation.

References

External links
 CGTM Official site.

Trade unions in Mauritania
International Trade Union Confederation
Trade unions established in 1993